Mōkena Kōhere (1812 – 4 March 1894) was a New Zealand tribal leader, assessor and politician. Of Māori descent, he identified with the Ngāti Porou iwi. He was born in Rangitukia, East Coast, New Zealand. He was a member of the New Zealand Legislative Council from his appointment on 11 October 1872 until his resignation on 25 April 1887. Rēweti Kōhere and Hēnare Kōhere were his grandsons. Mokena Kohere Street in Manakau, Horowhenua, is named for him.

References

1894 deaths
Ngāti Porou people
Māori politicians
People from Rangitukia
Members of the New Zealand Legislative Council
Māori MLCs
1812 births
19th-century New Zealand politicians
Halbert-Kohere family